During the 1991–92 season, Deportivo de La Coruña competed in the La Liga and the Copa del Rey. The club finished 17th and won the play-off to remain in the top division next season.

Competitions

Overall record

La Liga

League table

Results summary

Results by round

Matches

Copa del Rey

Fourth round

Fifth round

Round of 16

Quarter-finals

Semi-finals

References

Deportivo de La Coruña seasons
Deportivo de La Coruña